Kim Na-young (born November 18, 1990) is a South Korean former competitive figure skater. She is a two-time South Korean national champion (2007 & 2008), a two-time Asian Trophy silver medalist, and a two-time bronze medalist on the ISU Junior Grand Prix circuit.

Personal life
Kim Na-Young was born in 1990 in Jeonju, South Korea. She moved to Incheon when she was five years old.

Career
Kim began skating at age five. She landed her first double Axel jump at age 10. She placed 4th on the novice level at her first international competition, the 2002 Golden Bear of Zagreb. She was 12 years old at the time. She had a knee injury at age 13.

Kim was given her first Junior Grand Prix assignments in the 2005–2006 season, when she was 15. She placed 16th in the 2005–2006 ISU Junior Grand Prix event in Croatia and 19th in Estonia. Later that season, she won the silver medal on the junior level at the South Korean Championships.

During the 2006–2007 ISU Junior Grand Prix season, Kim placed 16th at her first event and then won the bronze medal at the event in Taipei. It was her first international medal. Although injured in a car accident in December 2006, she competed through injury and became the 2007 South Korean Junior national champion. She was sent to the 2007 Four Continents Championships, her senior international debut, where she placed 13th.

Kim won the silver medal at the Asian Figure Skating Championships.

During the 2007–2008 ISU Junior Grand Prix series, she placed 21st at the event in Austria, but won her second JGP bronze medal at the event in Croatia. At the 2007–2008 South Korean Figure Skating Championships, with Yuna Kim not competing, Kim Na-young won the gold medal. She was sent to the 2008 Four Continents Championships, where she placed 4th. Following this, she was sent to the 2008 World Championships and finished 19th.

Kim began the following season at the 2008 Nebelhorn Trophy. She initially received one senior Grand Prix assignment, to the 2008 NHK Trophy, and was later invited to the 2008 Cup of Russia due to vacancies created by some skaters withdrawing from the event.

Programs

Competitive highlights
GP: Grand Prix; JGP: Junior Grand Prix

References

External links

 

1990 births
Living people
South Korean female single skaters
People from Jeonju
Competitors at the 2009 Winter Universiade
Sportspeople from North Jeolla Province